Mohammad Yunus (May 4, 1884 – May 13, 1952) was the first Premier of British India's Bihar province. During his career, the heads of provincial governments were called Prime Ministers. He governed for three months in 1937, during the state's first democratic election.

Early life and education

Mohammad Yunus, the younger of two brothers, was born on May 4, 1884, in Penhara, a village located in Patna (Bihar). He belonged to a Muslim family that traces its descent back to the Sufi saint Malik Ibrahim Bayu.  He was the son of Ali Hassan Mukhtar, an advocate. His grandfather was Mohammad Azam, who served as District Judge of Munger (Monghyr).

Yunus started studying Urdu and Islamic studies from Shah Saheb from Amthua, Jehanabad, who later founded the Amthua Khanqah. He continued his education at the Patna Collegiate School, later traveling to the United Kingdom in the 1920s to continue his education and eventually pass the bar at Middle Temple, London.

Political career 
Yunus' followed the principle of Muttahda Qaumiat (United Nationhood) which was in contrast with the Two Nation Theory of the Muslim League.

He attended Lahore Session of congress as a delegate in 1908 but later left the Party. He became member of the Subject Committee of the 24th Session of the Congress held in Lahore in 1909. The other Members of the Society were Hasan Imam, Mr. Deep Narayan Singh, Dr A N Sinha, Mr. Kishan Sahay and Mr. Parmeswar.

Yunus also served briefly as All India Secretary of the Muslim League.  They became members of the Imperial Legislative Council in 1916 at the age of 32. Yunus became member of Bihar and Orissa Legislative Council in 1921. He was twice-elected a member of Patna Municipal Board, in 1917 and remained on its board from 1917 until 1923

He was elected to the position of the Chief Whip of the Democratic Party in 1921 and remained in the post until 1926. He was later elected as a member of the Bihar and Orissa Legislative Council in 1932. He presented a proposal for a new constitution to Lords Minto & Chelmsford and Mr. Montague, and many of his ideas found a place in the new Constitution. Yunus represented the Bihar Muslim Association and Bihar Landholder's Association as Chief Spokesman before the Simon Commission. He formed the Muslim Independent Party in 1936 with the help of Maulana Abul Mohasin Sajjad (Founder of Imarat-e- Sharia, Bihar) and became its founding President.

1937 election 
He resisted all efforts by Mohammad Ali Jinnah to merge the Party with the Muslim League before the 1937 election. The Muslim Independent Party ran in the 1937 election with the Congress on a seat sharing basis and became the second largest party in the House after the Congress. Yunus became a member of Bihar Legislative Council again in 1937 on the Muslim Independent Party Ticket from West Patna (Rural) Constituency and took his oath as First Premier of Bihar province on 1 April 1937 under the Government of India Act of 1935. His government had Abdul Wahab Khan as revenue Minister, Kumar Ajit Singh Deo as L.S.G. minister and Babu Guru Sahay Lal as River Development Minister. He also offered a ministerial position to Jagjivan Ram, but he declined the offer due to pressure from the Congress leadership.

Qazi Sahab, who was Nazim of Imarat-e-Sharia at that time and was also an important leader of Muslim Independent Party, had mixed feelings about the formation of the government. His view was that forming a government without the participation of a party which represented the second largest constituency of the country could lead to a serious divide between the two communities which became a reality in 1947 with the partition of India. Nevertheless, Barrister Yunus insisted on forming the government.

After the winning party in the 1937 elections declined to form a government, Yunus, as the leader of the Muslim Independent Party, was invited to form a government. During his brief tenure as Chief Minister, the legislative assembly enacted a number of significant motions. Bihar Band (Hartal) and several agitators were detained in front of his residence ("Dar-ul-Mallik") on Fraser Road in Patna on the second day of his tenure. Then youth leader Jayaprakash Narayan harshly criticized Barrister Yunus's acceptance of the governor's invitation to form the government. His party (Congress Socialist Party) continued protests against the Muslim Independent Party government because it did not have a majority in the house.

As the Muslim Independent Party got 20 seats of 40 seats reserved for Muslims and the Congress got only 4, the Muslim Independent Party wanted to form an alliance government with the Congress. However, the Congress refused Barrister Yunus' proposal and did its best to form the government alone. With just 4 of 40 Muslim members in the assembly, the Congress was unable to implement the Muslim mandate which was given to Muslim Independent Party in Bihar. Following the fall of his minority administration, the first Congress Ministry (headed by Premier Sri Krishna Singh and Dr. A.N. Sinha as deputy premier) was formed.

The same situation arose in West Bengal, culminating in the partition of India. All of these details may be found in the journal of Yasin Yunus, one of Mohammad Yunus' sons who also served as his political secretary.

Post partition 
After the partition, he played an active part in the movement to amend the Custodian Ordinance and worked shoulder-to-shoulder with Jamiat-e-Ulema on this issue. His suggestions found a place in the Minto-Morley Reforms.

Mohammad Yunus actively helped J. B. Kripalani and Mahamaya Prasad found the Kisan Mazdoor Praja Party (KMPP) in 1951. Mahamaya Prasad became state president of the party in Bihar and a member of the legislative council. In 1951, Yunus advised Maulana Manzoor Ejazi to refuse the proposal of the Congress party to nominate Maulana to the Bihar Legislative Council. The next day, after Maulana's refusal, Mahamaya Prasad accepted the nomination from the party and joined the legislative council. In the 1951 election, the KMPP emerged as the 3rd largest party of India after the Congress and the Socialist Party. The KMPP and the Socialist party later merged to form the Praja Socialist Party.

Other activities 
He was a Member of the Indian Institute of Science, Bangalore for 6 years. He was also the founding President of the All India Mail-Milap Association which was formed with the objective of achieving Hindu-Muslim unity on a social level, beyond political Interest and limitations.

He was the Secretary of Annie Besant's Theosophical Society.

Activities of Mohammad Yunus' sons 
His eldest son, Mohammad Yaqub Yunus, inherited his father's judicial heritage while staying out of politics, died in 1947 at the age of 40 while serving as a standing counsel for the Government of Bihar. Most of his political and business legacy was passed down to his younger son, Mohammad Yaqub Yunus (founding president of Bihar Muslim Majlis Mushawarat). Dar-ul-Mallik, his mansion, was afterwards turned into the Grand Hotel, while another portion became an Oriental Bank which was eventually demolished in the late 1990s. His grandson, Baber Yunus, who manages the Yunus Construction Company in Patna, erected the Grand Apartment in its place.

In addition to serving as standing counsel for the Government of Bihar in the Patna High Court, Muhammad Yasin Yunus, his second son, served as his father's political secretary, particularly during the key period of the Muslim Independent Party's formation and during his father's tenure as Chief Minister. He was appointed as standing counsel to the Bihar government in 1945 and received the letter appointing him as a judge in the Patna High Court. He died in 1946.

Mohammad Yaqub Yunus, a Patna High Court advocate, was a younger son who founded the All India Muslim Majlis-e- Mushawarat in 1967. He also held the position of President of the Aligarh Muslim University Old Boys Association in Bihar for a very long time and led the Aligarh Movement when the AMU came under scrutiny during the rule of Indira Gandhi.

Academic and judicial affairs

Yunus moved to England in 1903 to join the Society of the Middle Temple, and on January 26, 1906, he received his bar admission. He was admitted as a Barrister of the High Court of Justice of London on January 27. After just a brief period of practice in England, he returned to India in April 1906, and at the age of 22, he enrolled as an advocate in the Calcutta High Court Bar. In 1906, he began his legal career in the Patna District Court before rising to the position of Senior Advocate. He actively contested matters in the Privy Council of England, the Federal Court of Delhi, the Patna High Court, and the High Court of Calcutta.

Corporate affairs

 Founder of SearchLight Press in Patna, now known as Hindustan Times. In 1924 he started Patna Times as a weekly paper which in 1944 became a daily newspaper. Yunus was the editor and publisher of the newspaper.
 Founder of Orient Bank India Limited., which had branches and pay offices all over India. 
 Founder and Chairman of the Industrial Engineering Developments Limited with branches in Bihar, Bengal and Assam. 
 Founded the Great India Development Limited. This Company undertook construction of a large railway project in various Rajputana States, especially Indore and Marwar, and was to link up B.B. C.I. Railway and G.I.P. Railway. 
 Founder of Bihar Flying Club, which still existed . 
 Served as managing director of the Bihar Provincial Co-operative Bank
 Served as Director of the Bank of Bihar.
 Served as Director and Managing Agent of Bihar United Insurance Company.
 Opened Grand Hotel, Patna.

Personal life 
His first wife was Bibian Zeenatunissa, a descendant of Abdul Jabbar of Mirzapur, Uttar Pradesh. who passed away on March 19, 1924. On October 5, 1924, he married his second wife, the eldest daughter of the late Habibur Rahman of Irki, Jehanabad, Gaya, who was working as an assistant civil surgeon at the time. No children were born from this marriage.

Poetry
On December 29, 1944, Yunus had a heart attack. During his rehabilitation, particularly during his extended stay in Mussoorie in 1945, he started writing poetry. His best-known poems include "Marsiya," on the passing of Birbal Lal, the justice Manohar Lal's son, "Payam-e-Muhabbat," about the harmony between Hindus and Muslims, and "Kalam-e-Yunus," a letter to young people.

Death 
He died of a heart attack while walking down a street in London on May 13, 1952. He was buried in Brookwood Muslim Graveyard in London.

Legacy 

On 13 May 2012, Yunus' great grandson. Mohammad Kashif Yunus, organized a conference titled "Mohammad Yunus: Hayat Wa Khidmat," which as attended by Mr. Nand Kishore Yadav, the Road Construction minister of Bihar government. At the conference, the Chief Minister of Bihar, Mr. Nitish Kumar, announced the observation of an annual memorial of Yunus called "Rajkiya Samaroh" on May 4, Yunus' birthday. The first observation of the memorial took place on 4 May 2013.

Notes

References
 The Hindustan Times daily newspaper, Patna, 7 January 1990, Page- 7
The Sunday Searchlight Magazine, Patna, 12 August 1979
 Toote Hue Tare- Book written by Shah Mohammad Uthmani and published by his academician son.
 Husn-e-Sirat - book written by Shah Mohammad Uthmani which is a Biography of Qazi Sahab-founder Nazim of Imarat-e-Sahria Bihar
 Tazkira-e-Yunus written by prominent journalist Taqi Rahim
 Barrister Mohammad Yunus ke Daur-e-Wazarat ka ek Aks written by Asghar Imam Falsafi
 "Freedom and Partition and Season Changed" written by Syed Tanveer Hassan (Grand son of Sir SULTAN)

1884 births
1952 deaths
Indian Muslims
Politicians from Patna
Members of the Imperial Legislative Council of India